All or Nothing may refer to:

Film and television 
 All or Nothing (film), a 2002 film by Mike Leigh
 All or Nothing (game show), a 2004–2005 Russian game show based on Deal or No Deal
 All or Nothing (sports docuseries), an Amazon Prime series since 2016
 "All or Nothing" (Glee), a 2013 television episode
 "All or Nothing" (Wiseguy), a 1989 television episode
 "All or Nothing", a 2014 episode of The Amazing Race 25

Games and gaming
All or Nothing (lottery), a game format offered by multiple lotteries in the United States
 All or Nothing (video game), a computer game for the ZX Spectrum

Music

Albums
 [[All or Nothin' (54th Platoon album)|All or Nothin''' (54th Platoon album)]], 2002
 [[All or Nothin' (Nikki Lane album)|All or Nothin' (Nikki Lane album)]], 2014
 All or Nothing (Calyx and Teebee album), 2012
 All or Nothing (Fat Joe album), 2005
 All or Nothing (Jamala album) or the title song, 2013
 All or Nothing (Jay Sean album) or the title song (see below), 2009
 All or Nothing (Luba album), 1989
 All or Nothing (Mikeschair album) or the title song, 2014
 All or Nothing (Milli Vanilli album), a Europe-only release, or the title song (see below), 1988
 All or Nothing (Milli Vanilli remix album), the European version of the U.S. release Girl You Know It's True, 1989
 All or Nothing (Pennywise album) or the title song, 2012
 All or Nothing (Prime Circle album), 2008
 All or Nothing (Shopping album) or the title song, 2020
 All or Nothing (The Subways album) or the title song, 2008
 All or Nothing, by Aynsley Lister, 2002
 All or Nothing, by Christopher Lawrence, 2004
 Trill Entertainment Presents: All or Nothing, a compilation album, 2010

Songs
 "All or Nothing" (Cher song), 1999
 "All or Nothing" (Fiction Factory song), 1984
 "All or Nothing" (Joe song), 1994
 "All or Nothing" (KT Tunstall song), 2016
 "All or Nothing" (Milli Vanilli song), 1990
 "All or Nothing" (O-Town song), 2001; covered by Westlife (2006)
 "All or Nothing" (Small Faces song), 1966
 "All or Nothing" (Theory of a Deadman song), 2008
 "All Er Nuthin', a song from the musical Oklahoma! "All or Nothin, by Tom Petty and the Heartbreakers from Into the Great Wide Open "All or Nothing", by Au Revoir Simone from Still Night, Still Light "All or Nothing", by Europe from Prisoners in Paradise "All or Nothing", by Jay Sean from My Own Way "All or Nothing", by Lost Frequencies from Less Is More "All or Nothing", by Natalia from Wise Girl "All or Nothing", by Naughty Boy
 "All or Nothing", by Ratt from DetonatorOther uses
 All or nothing (armor), a method of armouring battleships
 All or nothing option or binary option, a financial exotic option
 All-or-nothing thinking or splitting, a psychological disorder or defense mechanism
 All-or-nothing transform, in cryptography, an encryption mode
 All-or-nothing mechanism, in horology, a part of a repeater

See also
 A todo o nada'' ("All or nothing"), an Argentine game show first aired in 2005
 "All or Nothing at All", a 1939 song by Arthur Altman and Jack Lawrence
 All or Nothing at All (album), a 1958 album by Billie Holiday
 All for Nothing (disambiguation)
 Atomicity (database systems), a property that indicates that, in a series of database operations, either all occur or nothing occurs
 False dilemma, a type of informal fallacy in which only two alternatives are considered
 All In (disambiguation)